Charles Grey (1540s – 26 September 1623) was Earl of Kent from 1615 to his death.

Personal life
Grey was a son of Henry Grey (1520–1545) and Margaret St. John. His paternal grandparents were Henry Grey, 4th Earl of Kent and Anne Blennerhassett.

He was a younger brother of Reginald Grey, 5th Earl of Kent and Henry Grey, 6th Earl of Kent.

He married Susan Cotton, daughter of Sir Richard Cotton. They had two children:

Henry Grey, 8th Earl of Kent (c. 1583–1639).
Susan Grey (bur. 13 December 1620). Married Sir Michael Longueville. They were parents to Charles Longueville, 12th Baron Grey de Ruthyn.

Career
He served from 1615 to his death as Lord Lieutenant of Bedfordshire. At first alone in his position, from 1621 jointly with his son Lord Grey de Ruthyn.

Sources
The Complete Peerage

External links
A Grey family pedigree

1540s births
1623 deaths
Earls of Kent (1465 creation)
Lord-Lieutenants of Bedfordshire
Charles
16th-century English nobility
17th-century English nobility
Burials at the de Grey Mausoleum (Flitton)
Barons Grey of Ruthin